Amaurosis (Greek meaning darkening, dark, or obscure) is vision loss or weakness that occurs without an apparent lesion affecting the eye. It may result from either a medical condition or excess acceleration, as in flight. The term is the same as the Latin gutta serena, which means, in Latin, drop clear (or drop bright). Gutta serena is a condition of partial or complete blindness with a transparent, clear pupil. This term contrasts with suffusio nigra which means, in Latin, suffusion dark,  indicating partial or complete blindness with a dark pupil, e.g., a cataract. Milton, already totally blind for twelve years (some scholars think from retinal detachment; others have diagnosed glaucoma) by the time he published Paradise Lost, refers to these terms in Book 3, lines 25–26.

Types
Leber's congenital amaurosis is an inherited disease resulting in optic atrophy and secondary severe vision loss or blindness.  It was first described by Theodore Leber in the 19th century.

Amaurosis fugax (Latin: fugax meaning fleeting) is a temporary loss of vision in one eye caused by decreased blood flow (ischemia) to the retina.
 It may also be caused by embolization from atherosclerotic plaques in the ipsilateral (same side) internal carotid artery. It is a type of transient ischaemic attack (TIA).  Those experiencing amaurosis usually experience complete symptom resolution within a few minutes.  In a small minority of those who experience amaurosis, stroke or permanent vision loss results.  Diabetes, hypertension and smoking are factors known to increase the risks of suffering this condition.  It also can be the result of surgical repair to the mitral valve, when very small emboli may break away from the site of the repair, while the patient's tissue grows to cover the plastic annuloplasty band.

Quinidine toxicity can lead to cinchonism and also to quinine amaurosis.

Management
Those experiencing amaurosis are usually advised to consult a physician immediately as any form of vision loss, even if temporary, is a symptom that may indicate the presence of a serious ocular or systemic problem.

In animals
This condition can also occur in ruminants suffering from a vitamin B1 (thiamine) deficiency due to thiamine-related cerebrocortical necrosis (CCN).

References

Eye diseases
Neurological disorders